Adarnase is a masculine Georgian name derived from the Persian name Ādurnarsēh.

Adarnase may refer to:
Adarnase I of Tao-Klarjeti, Georgian prince
Adarnase I of Iberia, Georgian prince
Adarnase II of Iberia, Georgian prince
Adarnase II of Klarjeti, Georgian prince
Adarnase II of Tao-Klarjeti, Georgian prince
Adarnase III of Iberia, Georgian prince
Adarnase III of Tao, Georgian prince
Adarnase IV of Iberia, Georgian king
Adarnase V of Tao, Georgian prince
Prince Adarnase of Kartli, Georgian prince royal
Adarnase of Abkhazia, Georgian king

Georgian masculine given names